Barakani is a village in the commune of Ouangani on Mayotte.

Populated places in Mayotte